The third season of Mad TV, an American sketch comedy series, originally aired in the United States on the Fox Network between September 20, 1997, and May 16, 1998.

Season summary
At the start of season three, one fourth of the original cast (Bryan Callen, Orlando Jones and Artie Lange [who left midway through season 2 due to his cocaine addiction] and featured player Pablo Francisco) was replaced by newcomers Alex Borstein (who would later do voicework and writing work on FOX's Family Guy and have a supporting role on The Marvelous Mrs. Maisel), Chris Hogan, Pat Kilbane, Lisa Kushell, Will Sasso, and Aries Spears.

This was the last season to feature original cast members David Herman (who went on to do voice acting work and appear in such Mike Judge projects as King of the Hill and Idiocracy) and Mary Scheer (who quit show business to be a full-time mother).

This was the last season Fax Bahr and Adam Small would produce Mad TV with Quincy Jones and David Salzman, although Barr and Small are still credited as "executive consultants". They went on to create Blue Collar TV, a similar sketch show that ran from 2004 to 2006 on the WB.

This was the last season Alfred E. Neuman and the bomb sequence was seen in the opening credits. However, Neuman's image still appeared on the Mad TV stage in the fourth season. There were reruns of Spy vs. Spy and Don Martin cartoon shorts in this season as well as the fourth and fifth seasons since the last episodes starring them were in the second season.

Spy vs Spy pictures were appeared on cameo idle on this season.

This was the first season in which Mad TV showed "classics", i.e. reruns of sketches from previous seasons.

Opening montage
The title sequence begins with several fingers pointing at a bomb. Then the bomb explodes and a picture of Alfred E. Neuman and a brain appears on a purple screen followed by the Mad TV logo. The theme song, which is performed by the hip-hop group Heavy D & the Boyz, begins. Cast members are introduced alphabetically with their names appearing in caption over black-and-white still photos of them. When the last cast member is introduced, the music stops and the title sequence ends with the phrase "You are now watching Mad TV."

Cast

Repertory cast members
 Alex Borstein* (20/25 episodes) 
 David Herman  (4/25 episodes; last episode: November 1, 1997)
 Chris Hogan * (23/25 episodes) 
 Pat Kilbane * (25/25 episodes) 
 Lisa Kushell* (25/25 episodes) 
 Phil LaMarr  (25/25 episodes) 
 Will Sasso  (25/25 episodes) 
 Mary Scheer  (17/25 episodes) 
 Aries Spears  (24/25 episodes) 
 Nicole Sullivan  (25/25 episodes) 
 Debra Wilson  (24/25 episodes) 

Featured cast members
 Craig Anton
 Tim Conlon

* Performer was a featured cast member at the start of the season, but was promoted to repertory status mid-season.

Writers

Fax Bahr (eps. 1-25)
Garry Campbell (eps. 1-25)
Blaine Capatch (eps. 1-25)
Lauren Dombrowski (eps. 1-25)
Chris Finn (eps. 20, 25)
Spencer Green (eps. 1-25)
Brian Hartt (writing supervisor) (eps. 1-25)
Jordan Hawley (ep. 23) (Season 01 Encore)
Torian Hughes (eps. 7, 12-25)
Scott King (eps. 1-25)
Lanier Laney (eps. 1-25)
Patton Oswalt (ep. 18) (Season 02 Encore)
Aaron Michael Peters (eps. 8, 17, 22)
Wiley Roberts (eps. 1-11)
David Rotman (eps. 9, 15)
Michael Short (creative consultant) (eps. 1-25)
Adam Small (eps. 1-25)
Nicole Sullivan (ep. 13)
Terry Sweeney (eps. 1-25)
Mary Elizabeth Williams (eps. 1-11, 13-25)

Episodes

Home releases
Shout! Factory released the third season on DVD on June 25, 2013.

On the HBO Max release, episodes 1, 4, 9, 11, and 22 are missing.

External links
Mad TV - Official Website

Jump The Shark - Mad TV

03
1997 American television seasons
1998 American television seasons